Edwin Bernet (born 16 March 1935) is a Swiss sailor. He competed at the 1968 Summer Olympics and the 1972 Summer Olympics.

References

External links
 

1935 births
Living people
Swiss male sailors (sport)
Olympic sailors of Switzerland
Sailors at the 1968 Summer Olympics – Star
Sailors at the 1972 Summer Olympics – Star
Sportspeople from Zürich
20th-century Swiss people